Meghann Moira Lanning  (born 25 March 1992) is an Australian cricketer who currently captains the national women's team. Lanning has been a member of seven successful world championship campaigns, winning two Women's Cricket World Cup and five ICC Women's World Twenty20 titles. She holds the record for the most Women's One Day International centuries and is the first Australian to score 2,000 Twenty20 International runs.  

In January 2022, in the one-off Women's Test match as part of the Women's Ashes against England, Lanning became just the third cricketer after England's Charlotte Edwards and India's Mithali Raj to captain her side in 150 women's international matches.

Domestically, Lanning plays for Victoria in the Women's National Cricket League and the Melbourne Stars in the Women's Big Bash League.  She is also the captain of the Delhi Capitals in the Women's Premier League.

Early life and education 
Lanning was born in Singapore to father Wayne, a banker, and mother Sue. Her family shortly thereafter relocated to the Sydney suburb of Thornleigh, where she attended Warrawee Public School. Lanning began playing organised cricket at the age of ten, following a suggestion from her teacher to try out for a regional team. She went on to represent New South Wales at primary school level alongside several future Australian team mates, including Ellyse Perry. While growing up, her sporting idols were Ricky Ponting and Paul Kelly.

Ahead of her first year at high school, Lanning's family uprooted again, moving to the Melbourne suburb of Kew. She attended Carey Baptist Grammar School and, at 14 years of age, made headlines by becoming the first girl to play First XI cricket for an Associated Public Schools team.  In 2021, Lanning was awarded the Carey Medal, which is presented annually to a past or present student, staff member or parent in "recognition of exceptional and outstanding service to the wider community".

Lanning has also completed a Bachelor's degree in Exercise and Health Science at the Australian Catholic University. She graduated in 2019.

International cricket

2010–12: Limited overs debut, first World Twenty20 title 
Lanning made her international cricket debut on 30 December 2010 in a T20I against New Zealand at Saxton Oval, scoring ten runs in a four-wicket victory. She then played in her first ODI on 5 January 2011 against England at the WACA Ground, scoring 20 in a 33-run victory (via the Duckworth–Lewis method). On both occasions, she appeared alongside fellow debutant Sarah Coyte.

Two days later, Lanning scored her maiden ODI century, making 103 not out off 118 balls to help Australia defeat England by nine wickets. At 18 years and 288 days, she became the country's youngest-ever centurion—a record previously held by Ricky Ponting at 21 years and 21 days.

At the 2012 ICC Women's World Twenty20, Lanning was the third-highest run-scorer with 138 across five innings. She made 25 off 24 balls against England in the final which Australia went on to win by four runs.

In an ODI against New Zealand on 17 December at North Sydney Oval, Lanning "blitzed" a century off 45 balls to lead her team to an emphatic nine-wicket victory, surpassing Karen Rolton's record for the fastest hundred by an Australian woman.

2013: Cricket World Cup success, Test debut 
During a group stage match against New Zealand at the 2013 Women's Cricket World Cup, Lanning scored 112 off 104 deliveries and formed a 182-run partnership with Jess Duffin to help chase down a target of 228 with seven wickets in hand and 70 balls remaining. She contributed 31 from 41 in the final against the West Indies, which Australia won by 114 runs to be crowned 50-over world champions.

During the 2013 Women's Ashes, Lanning made her Test debut on 11 August at Sir Paul Getty's Ground. She was run out for 48 in the first innings and made 38 in the second. The match ended in a draw.

2014–16: Assumption of captaincy, second World Twenty20 title 
On 19 January 2014, Lanning became Australia's youngest-ever captain, standing in for Jodie Fields mid-way through the 2013–14 Women's Ashes. She scored 78 not out from 54 balls in a T20I at Bellerive Oval, although England would go on to win the match by nine wickets and consequently clinch the series.

In February 2014, Lanning was appointed as the full-time captain of Australia's T20 team. In a retrospective interview, she described the decision as "a bit of a shock because I hadn't really thought too much about leadership or anything like that". At the 2014 World Twenty20, Lanning was the tournament's top run-scorer, compiling 257 across six innings. During a group stage match against Ireland, she made 126 runs from 65 balls to set a new record for highest individual total in women's T20Is. In the final against England, she scored 44 off 30 to help Australia chase down a target of 106 with seven wickets in hand and 29 balls remaining.

Lanning was confirmed as the national team's captain for all three forms of the game in June 2014. The Sydney Morning Herald reported the appointment as a "messy captaincy handover" from incumbent Fields, who subsequently retired from international cricket despite urges from Australian selectors to reconsider.

In the second ODI of the 2015 Women's Ashes, Lanning scored 104 from 98 deliveries and formed a partnership of 132 with Ellyse Perry in a 63-run win. She followed up with another strong performance in the following match, scoring 85 off 89 to help defeat England by 89 runs. Australia went on to secure a series victory in the T20I leg of the tour, marking Lanning's first Ashes triumph as captain.

On 21 March 2016, Lanning was dismissed without scoring for the first time in a Twenty20 International, setting a record for most T20I innings (61) before registering a duck.

2017–18: Struggle with injury, third World Twenty20 title 

Having broken the record for most centuries (ten) in Women's One Day Internationals earlier in the year, Lanning entered the 2017 Women's Cricket World Cup under a fitness cloud, battling a persistent right shoulder ailment. Australia's first match of the tournament started in "chaotic fashion" at the coin toss when West Indies captain Stafanie Taylor called correctly and elected to bat before quickly changing her mind, only for Lanning to object. After much debate, match referee David Jukes adjudicated Taylor's first call had to stand. Following an eight-wicket defeat of the West Indies, Lanning shrugged off injury concerns with an innings of 152 not out from 135 balls against Sri Lanka. She would, however, go on to sit out of group stage matches against Pakistan and South Africa. At the conclusion of the tournament, from which Australia were eliminated via a 36-run semi-final loss to India, CA announced Lanning would undergo shoulder surgery that was expected to sideline her for six to eight months.

Lanning made her return to international cricket on a tour of India in March 2018, during which she became the second-fastest woman to reach 3,000 runs in ODIs and the first Australian to score 2,000 runs in T20Is. At the 2018 World Twenty20 tournament in the West Indies, Lanning scored 28 not out in the final against England and hit the winning run to secure another championship for Australia.

2019–present: Fourth T20 World Cup title 
During the only Test of the 2019 Women's Ashes, Lanning recorded her first half-century in cricket's longest format. With the match petering out as a "dull" draw, her tactical decisions as captain—including the timing of declarations and employment of a second new ball—were questioned by several commentators amidst suggestions that "cricket was the loser" and that "a will to win and a desire to do the long format justice went astray". Regardless, the series was dominated by Australia, and outright victory was secured on 29 July at Chelmsford with a 93-run win in the first T20I of the tour. The match was notable for Lanning's innings of 133 not out off 63 balls, making it the second time she had set a new record for highest individual total in women's T20Is.

Lanning played two key innings for Australia at the 2020 Women's T20 World Cup. The first occurred in a group stage victory over Sri Lanka at the WACA Ground, during which she scored 41 not out and formed a 95-run partnership with Rachael Haynes. The match, which saw Australia recover from 3/10 to chase down a target of 123 with three balls remaining, was Lanning's 100th T20I appearance. Her second notable performance of the tournament took place in the semi-final at the Sydney Cricket Ground. She made 49 not out in a rain-affected encounter to help defeat South Africa by five runs (via the Duckworth–Lewis–Stern method). Lanning's team went on to defeat India in the final at the Melbourne Cricket Ground by 85 runs, consequently placing her alongside Lyn Larsen and Michael Clarke as the only Australian cricketers to captain a World Cup title win on home soil.

In November 2020, Lanning was nominated for the Rachael Heyhoe Flint Award for ICC Female Cricketer of the Decade, and the awards for women's ODI and T20I cricketer of the decade. On 4 April 2021, Lanning led Australia in a six-wicket victory against New Zealand, marking the team's world record-breaking 22nd ODI win in a row.

In January 2022, Lanning was named as the captain of Australia's squad for their series against England to contest the Women's Ashes. Later the same month, she was named as the captain of Australia's team for the 2022 Women's Cricket World Cup in New Zealand. In May 2022, Lanning was named as the captain of Australia's team for the cricket tournament at the 2022 Commonwealth Games in Birmingham, England.

Domestic cricket

Women's National Cricket League 
Lanning has captained Victoria since 2014 and is yet to play in a Women's National Cricket League (WNCL) championship-winning team despite consistently being a standout performer. She made her debut on 6 December 2008, scoring three runs in a win against the South Australian Scorpions. A breakout season in 2010–11 resulted in two half-centuries and an average of 67.33. Lanning recorded her first WNCL century on 29 October 2011, making 127 off 123 balls against the Queensland Fire. Her form across the 2011–12 season earned her the Sharon Tredrea Trophy as Victoria's Player of the Year. She has since won the same award on five more occasions.

On 10 November 2012, Lanning broke the record for the highest individual WNCL score, making 175 from 143 balls against the ACT Meteors, surpassing the previous record of 173 set by Karen Rolton. Eight days later, she made 241 not out off 136 balls for Box Hill in the Victorian Women's Cricket Association (the highest individual total in Women's Premier Cricket until she broke the record again six seasons later with a score of 244 off 145 balls). On 29 October 2016, Lanning surpassed her own WNCL record by scoring 190 runs off 153 balls against Tasmania. She was named Player of the Tournament for the 2016–17 season, although her team failed to qualify for the final.

Women's Big Bash League

Melbourne Stars 
At the official Women's Big Bash League (WBBL) launch on 10 July 2015, Lanning was unveiled as the Melbourne Stars' first-ever player signing and captain. She was the leading run-scorer in the inaugural season, compiling 560 at an average of 56.00, and was named Player of the Tournament. Although she led the league for runs again in 2016–17, the Stars narrowly missed out on qualifying for the finals for the second consecutive season.

Perth Scorchers 

Ahead of WBBL03, Lanning departed the Melbourne Stars and signed on to captain the Perth Scorchers. She did not play a game with the club in the 2017–18 season due to undergoing shoulder surgery. In 2018–19, Lanning continued to be troubled with injuries, consequently playing just nine of 14 games. She nevertheless "hit a rich run of form" late in the tournament, managing 389 runs at an average of 48.62, but once again her team fell less than a game short of qualifying for finals.

Lanning was the fourth-highest run-scorer in WBBL05, finishing with 531 at an average of 40.84. She recorded her first WBBL century on 1 December 2019 in a 35-run win over the Hobart Hurricanes. The Scorchers finished the regular season in third place, resulting in Lanning's first WBBL finals appearance, although they were comfortably knocked out of the tournament via an eight-wicket semi-final loss to the Adelaide Strikers.

Return to the Stars 
In June 2020, Lanning flagged the possibility of an imminent WBBL homecoming. With her contract at the Scorchers expired, she announced a return to her former team on 22 July, signing a new deal to play for the Melbourne Stars in WBBL06. On 22 September, the Stars announced Lanning would resume her role as captain of the team. With an innings of 51 not out from 38 balls against the Perth Scorchers on 7 November at North Sydney Oval, she became the league's first player to score a half-century against all eight teams. The Stars finished the regular season in first place but suffered a comprehensive defeat in the final at the hands of the Sydney Thunder. Lanning's decision at the coin toss to bat first—a tactic she hadn't used since the 2016–17 season—was described by commentators as a "surprise", a "shock", and a "risky move" that backfired.

The Hundred
In April 2022, Lanning was bought by the Trent Rockets for the 2022 season of The Hundred in England.

Records and statistics

Overview 
Lanning holds the record for the most Women's One Day International centuries. She took that record from Charlotte Edwards on 5 March 2017, when she scored 104* in a match against New Zealand at Bay Oval, Mount Maunganui, to lead Australia to a 2–1 victory in a Rose Bowl series. She has also scored two Women's Twenty20 International centuries. Her international centuries are:

One Day International centuries

Twenty20 International centuries

Honours

Team 
 2× Women's Cricket World Cup champion: 2013, 2022
 5× ICC Women's World Twenty20 champion: 2012, 2014, 2018, 2020, 2023
 Commonwealth Games champion: 2022
 3× Australian Women's Twenty20 Cup champion: 2009–10, 2010–11, 2011–12

Individual 
 ICC Women's ODI Cricketer of the Year: 2015
 ICC Women's T20I Cricketer of the Year: 2014
 Wisden Leading Woman Cricketer in the World: 2015
 3× Belinda Clark Award winner: 2014, 2015, 2017
 Women's National Cricket League Player of the Tournament: 2016–17
 6× Sharon Tredrea Trophy winner: 2011–12, 2012–13, 2014–15, 2015–16, 2016–17, 2018–19
 Women's Big Bash League Player of the Tournament: 2015–16
 2× Melbourne Stars Player of the Season: 2015–16, 2016–17
Australian Women's Health Sport Awards Leadership Legend: 2019
 Member of the Order of Australia

Personal life
Lanning's nicknames are "Megastar" and "Serious Sally", the latter being an allusion to her level-headedness. Early in her career, she had another nickname, "Fui": "There is a rugby league player called Fui Fui Moi Moi and as my middle name is Moira - I then got Fui."

Lanning has a strong interest in a variety of other sports, representing Victoria in hockey at junior level (and also having played at senior level for the Hawthorn Hockey Club) as well as supporting the Sydney Swans in Australian rules football. The fourth of five children, Lanning has been a member of top-level domestic cricket teams alongside her younger sister, Anna.

In August 2022, Lanning announced an indefinite hiatus from cricket, citing personal reasons. During her break, she worked in a café and also spent time travelling, and received praise among the cricket community for the "brave" decision to take time away from the sport. She returned to international cricket in January 2023, for a bilateral series against Pakistan.

Notes

References

External links

 
Meg Lanning at Cricket Australia
Meg Lanning Biography

1992 births
Australia women Twenty20 International cricketers
Australia women One Day International cricketers
Living people
Melbourne Stars (WBBL) cricketers
People educated at Carey Baptist Grammar School
Cricketers from Melbourne
Sportswomen from Victoria (Australia)
Victoria women cricketers
Australia Test cricket captains
Perth Scorchers (WBBL) cricketers
Delhi Capitals (WPL) cricketers
IPL Supernovas cricketers
Wisden Leading Woman Cricketers in the World
Australia women Test cricketers
Members of the Order of Australia
Cricketers at the 2022 Commonwealth Games
Commonwealth Games gold medallists for Australia
Commonwealth Games medallists in cricket
Medallists at the 2022 Commonwealth Games